Marquess Su of Zhao (died 326 BCE, reigned 349 BCE – 326 BCE) reigned in the State of Zhao during the early Warring States period of Chinese history.

Marquess Su of Zhao reigned during a time when the authority of the Zhou kings was fast declining. In 344 BCE, the Marquesses of Wei and Qi agreed to recognize each other as kings (thus putting them on parity with Zhou royalty). Angered by the exclusion of his state, Marquess Su laid siege to Wei fortresses in the north. This failed; and in anticipation of possible retaliatory attacks, he ordered the construction of walls along the northern and southern borders, as well as along the course of the Zhang River.

Marquess Su died in 326 BCE. The states of Qin, Chu, Yan, Qi, and Wei each sent ten thousand crack troops to Zhao to attend the funeral. His son, Zhao Yong, succeeded him and became King Wuling of Zhao.

Monarchs of Zhao (state)
Year of birth missing
326 BC deaths
Zhou dynasty nobility
4th-century BC Chinese monarchs
Zhao (state)